Elettrodomestico is the second studio album of the Italian band Punkreas, released in 1997.

Track listing
 Sesto senso - 3:01
 Senza sicura - 2:44
 Vulcani - 3:34
 Frecce avvelenate - 2:28
 Il mercato del niente - 3:05
 Ambarabà - 4:17
 Vegetale - 2:24
 Psichiatria - 2:45
 Chiapas - 2:54
 Ultima notte - 4:01

References

1997 albums
Punkreas albums